The 2020–21 Cypriot Cup was the 79th edition of the Cypriot Cup. A total of 26 clubs were accepted to enter the competition. It began in September 2020 with the first round and will conclude in May 2021 with the final. The winner of the Cup will qualify for the 2021–22 Europa League third qualifying round.

First round
The first round draw took place on 4 September 2020 and the matches were played on 16 September – 21 October 2020. The four clubs qualified for European competition, Omonia, Anorthosis Famagusta, APOEL and Apollon Limassol, received a bye for this round. Enosis Neon Paralimni received another bye in the draw.

|}

Intermediate round
An intermediate round match was played between PAEEK and APOEL on 28 October 2020.

|}

Second round
The second round draw took place on 19 October 2020 and the matches were played on 28 October 2020 – 20 January 2021. Omonia received a bye to the quarter-finals due to participating in the 2020–21 UEFA Europa League group stage.

|}

Quarter-finals
The quarter-final round draw took place on 4 February 2021 and the matches were played on 24 February – 17 March 2021.
 
  

      
              
|}

Semi-finals
The semi-final round draw took place on 22 March 2021 and the matches were played on 14–21 April 2021.
 

  
|}

Final

See also	
 2020–21 Cypriot First Division	
 2020–21 Cypriot Second Division

References

	

Cup
Cyprus
Cypriot Cup seasons